A pau was a customary unit of capacity used in Brunei, Malaysia, Sabah, and Sarawak. A pau was 2 imperial gills (approximately 0.284 liters or 0.600 US pints).

See also
List of customary units of measurement in South Asia
Malay units of measurement

References

Obsolete units of measurement
Units of volume